Choi Myung-hoon (born May 12, 1975) is a professional Go player.

Biography 
Choi was promoted to 9 dan in 2004. In 2000, he won his first and only title, the LG Refined Oil Cup.

Titles & runners-up

External links
GoBase Profile
Sensei's Library Profile

Living people
1975 births
South Korean Go players